HMCS Penetang was a  that served in the Royal Canadian Navy from 1944 to 1945 during the Second World War. She fought in the Battle of the Atlantic as a convoy escort. She was named for Penetanguishene, Ontario.

Penetang was ordered in June 1942 as part of the 1942 River-class building programme. She was laid down as Rouyn on 22 September 1943 by Davie Shipbuilding & Repairing Co. Ltd. at Lauzon and launched 6 July 1944. Her name was changed and she was commissioned as Penetang into the RCN at Quebec City on 19 October 1944 with the pennant K676.

Background

The River-class frigate was designed by William Reed of Smith's Dock Company of South Bank-on-Tees. Originally called a "twin-screw corvette", its purpose was to improve on the convoy escort classes in service with the Royal Navy at the time, including the Flower-class corvette. The first orders were placed by the Royal Navy in 1940 and the vessels were named for rivers in the United Kingdom, giving name to the class. In Canada they were named for towns and cities though they kept the same designation. The name "frigate" was suggested by Vice-Admiral Percy Nelles of the Royal Canadian Navy and was adopted later that year.

Improvements over the corvette design included improved accommodation which was markedly better. For underwater targets, the River-class frigate was equipped with a Hedgehog anti-submarine mortar and depth charge rails aft and four side-mounted throwers.

River-class frigates were the first Royal Canadian Navy warships to carry the 147B Sword horizontal fan echo sonar transmitter in addition to the irregular ASDIC. This allowed the ship to maintain contact with targets even while firing unless a target was struck. Improved radar and direction-finding equipment improved the RCN's ability to find and track enemy submarines over the previous classes.

Canada originally ordered the construction of 33 frigates in October 1941. The design was too big for the shipyards on the Great Lakes so all the frigates built in Canada were built in dockyards along the west coast or along the St. Lawrence River. In all Canada ordered the construction of 60 frigates including ten for the Royal Navy that transferred two to the United States Navy.

Service history
After working up in Bermuda in November 1944, Penetang was assigned to Escort Group 9 of the Mid-Ocean Escort Force (MOEF) as a convoy escort on trans-Atlantic supply convoys. She served the remainder of the war with the group, returning to Canada in June 1945. Upon the end of hostilities in Europe, Penetang was used as a troop-carrier between St. John's and Quebec City. She was one of the few new River-class frigates not to be sent for a tropicalization refit. She was paid off into the reserve at Shelburne, Nova Scotia on 10 November 1945. In December 1945 she was sold to Marine Industries Ltd.

Penetang was chosen as one of the River-class frigates to undergo conversion to a Prestonian-class frigate. She was reacquired from Marine Industries Ltd. and underwent conversion in 1953–1954 at George T. Davie and Sons shipyard at Lauzon, Quebec. She was recommissioned there with pennant 316 on 1 June 1954. Following her reentry into service, Penetang was assigned to the First Canadian Escort Squadron.

Royal Norwegian Navy
Penetang was transferred to the Royal Norwegian Navy on 10 March 1956 where she was renamed HNoMS Draug, after the revenant Draugr from folklore. Draug was purchased outright in 1959 and served with the Norwegian navy employed on fishery protection duties. She served with the Norwegian navy until she was decommissioned and scrapped in 1966.

See also
 List of current ships of the Royal Canadian Navy
 List of Royal Norwegian Navy ships

References

Notes

Sources
 
 

River-class frigates of the Royal Canadian Navy
1944 ships
Ships built in Quebec